Christian fraternity can refer to:

Organisations 
Christian fraternity (fraternities and sororities)
Religious order
Confraternity

Concepts 
Brotherly love (philosophy)
Brothers and Sisters in Christ

See also 
 Fraternity (philosophy)
 Fratelli tutti